Doris Totten Chase (29 April 1923 – 13 December 2008) was an American painter, teacher, and sculptor. She was a member of the Northwest School. Chase had a substantial career as a painter and sculptor before she set off for New York, where she made video art.

Early years
Chase was born Doris Mae Totten, the only daughter of a Seattle attorney. She attended Ravenna Grade School, and graduated from Roosevelt High School in 1941. From 1941 to 1943 she studied architecture at the University of Washington, pledging the Chi Omega sorority before dropping out of college in 1943 to marry Elmo Chase, a lieutenant in the U.S. Navy.

Art career
To support her family, which had grown to two children, Chase taught painting and design at Edison Technical School. Chase was accepted into Women Painters of Washington in 1951. She remained a member until the mid-1960s.

Northwest painter Kenneth Callahan, in an article for The Seattle Times, reviewed Chase's first solo exhibition in 1956 at the Otto Seligman Gallery, and called Chase "a serious and talented young painter."

In 1972 she moved to New York. She began creating video art, using computer imaging when video art was new. Chase was encouraged by the video artist, Nam June Paik, to explore video art and during 1973 to 1974, she participated in the Experimental Television Center’s Residency Program.

She began by integrating her sculptures with interactive dancers, using special effects to create dreamlike work. Victor Ancona said of Chase's dance videos, "Watching her tapes gave me the feeling of being transported to an enchanted, phosphorescent environment unceasingly in flux, a voyage I will long remember".

Chase's most widely shown work is a series of 30-minute video dramas regarding older women's autonomy, titled By Herself. Table for One (1985), stars Geraldine Page in a voice-over monologue of a woman uneasy about dining alone, followed by Dear Papa (1986), starring Anne Jackson and her daughter Roberta Wallach. The third video was A Dancer (1987). Still Frame (1988) featured Priscilla Pointer and Robert Symonds. Sophie (1989) featured Joan Plowright as a woman who has just left her philandering husband to become "Sophie, reader of French tarot cards". The first two videos were presented at the Berlin and London Film Festivals in 1985 and 1986. Dear Papa won First Prize at Paris' 1986 Women's International Film Festival.

Later years
In 1993, Chase produced a video documentary about her home, the Chelsea Hotel. The Chelsea Hotel was originally conceived as New York's first major cooperative apartment house, owned by a consortium of wealthy families in 1883, becoming a hotel in 1905. Chase's video paid tribute to the building's 110th anniversary, and those who have called it home. In 1999, her four-piece bronze sculpture Moon Gates, 17 feet high, was installed at Seattle Center. The Seattle Art Museum has only one Chase work in its collection: a 1950s oil painting. Documents relating to the production of her video works are held in The Celeste Bartos International Film Study Center at the Museum of Modern Art, New York.

She died in 2008 from a combination of Alzheimer's disease and a series of strokes.

Collections
Seattle Art Museum
Smithsonian American Art Museum
Henry Art Gallery, Seattle

Filmography

Director
Glass Curtain (1990) (V)
Sophie (1990)
A Dancer (1988) (TV)
Still Frame (1988)
Dear Papa (1986)

Writer
Glass Curtain (1990) (V)
Sophie (1990)
Still Frame (1988)
Dear Papa (1986)

Cinematographer
Glass Curtain (1990)
Sophie (1990)
Still Frame (1988)
Dear Papa (1986)

References

Further reading
Allison, B., Chase, D., Anderson, J., Anderson, J., Bader, W., Balasz, H., Baskin, L., Behl, W., Breitenbach, R. R., & Castle, W. (1967). Design and aesthetics in wood: an exhibition. [Syracuse, N.Y.]: State University of New York.
Women artist filmmakers. (1976). Cincinnati, Ohio: College of Design, Architecture, and Art.
Godwin, P. (1988). A truce with time: a love story with occasional ghosts. Toronto: Bantam Books.
Failing, P. (1991). Doris Chase, artist in motion: from painting and sculpture to video art. Seattle: University of Washington Press.
Failing, P. (1991). Full circle: a profile of video artist Doris Chase. Seattle: University of Washington Press.
Ament, D. T., & Randlett, M. (2002). Iridescent light: the emergence of northwest art. Seattle, WA: University of Washington Press.
Art Gym. (2004). Northwest matriarchs of modernism: 12 proto-feminists from Oregon and Washington. Marylhurst, Oregon: Marylhurst University.

`

1923 births
2008 deaths
Artists from Seattle
20th-century American painters
21st-century American painters
American video artists
American women painters
Sculptors from Washington (state)
American women cinematographers
Modern painters
Northwest School (art)
Pacific Northwest artists
American women video artists
American women sculptors
20th-century American sculptors
21st-century American sculptors
20th-century American women artists
21st-century American women artists
American cinematographers
American contemporary painters